Philip Ryan may refer to:
 Philip Ryan, Irish political editor and columnist with the Irish Independent
 Philip Ryan (dual player) (born 1944), Irish hurler and Gaelic footballer
 Philip Ryan (priest), Irish Anglican priest
 Philip Ryan (Gaelic footballer), Gaelic footballer for St Brigid's

See also
 Phillip Ryan, a character from the TV series Waterloo Road